Victor R. McCrary, Jr. (born May 16, 1955) is an American physical chemist who is vice president for research at the University of the District of Columbia. He is a fellow of the American Chemical Society and former president of the National Organization for the Professional Advancement of Black Chemists and Chemical Engineers.

Early life and education 
McCrary was born and raised in Washington, D.C. He earned a Bachelor of Arts degree in chemistry from the Catholic University of America, a PhD in chemistry from Howard University, and a Master of Science in engineering and technology management from the University of Pennsylvania.

Career 
After earning his doctorate, McCrary joined Bell Labs as a member of the technical team. In 1995 he joined the National Institute of Standards and Technology, where he led convergent systems.

McCrary joined Johns Hopkins Applied Physics Laboratory in 2003. In 2007, he was made President at the National Organization for the Professional Advancement of Black Chemists and Chemical Engineers (NOBCChE). McCary worked as vice chancellor at the University of Tennessee and vice president of Morgan State University.

In October 2016 McCary was appointed to the National Science Board. He was made vice chair in July 2020.

Personal life 
McCrary is Catholic, a long-time member of the Knights of Columbus, and parishioner at Saint John the Evangelist in Columbia, Maryland.

Awards and honors 
 2002 Percy L. Julian Award
 2007 DVD Association DVD Hall of Fame
 2011 Black Engineer of the Year Awards Scientist of the Year

Select publications

References 

Living people
1955 births
Howard University alumni
American physical chemists
Johns Hopkins University faculty
Fellows of the American Chemical Society
National Institute of Standards and Technology people
University of Tennessee faculty
Morgan State University faculty
Scientists at Bell Labs
African-American Catholics